Strahinja Milošević (Serbian Cyrillic: Страхиња Милошевић; born September 25, 1985) is a Serbian professional basketball player for Falco KC of the Hungarian Basketball League.

While playing for Partizan, from 2007 to 2010, Milošević won three consecutive Adriatic League, Basketball League of Serbia and Radivoj Korać Cup titles. He also won three medals at the Summer Universiade.

References

External links

 Strahinja Milošević at aba-liga.com
 Strahinja Milošević at euroleague.net

1985 births
Living people
ABA League players
Basketball League of Serbia players
KK Budućnost players
KK Crvena zvezda players
KK Partizan players
KK Vojvodina Srbijagas players
Liga ACB players
Real Betis Baloncesto players
Serbian men's 3x3 basketball players
Serbian expatriate basketball people in Hungary
Serbian expatriate basketball people in Montenegro
Serbian expatriate basketball people in North Macedonia
Serbian expatriate basketball people in Spain
Serbian men's basketball players
Small forwards
Basketball players from Novi Sad
Szolnoki Olaj KK players
Universiade bronze medalists for Serbia and Montenegro
Universiade gold medalists for Serbia
Universiade medalists in basketball
Universiade silver medalists for Serbia
Medalists at the 2009 Summer Universiade